Ariophanta is a genus of air-breathing land snails, terrestrial pulmonate gastropod mollusks in the subfamily Ariophantinae  of the family Ariophantidae. 

The shell is sinistral or left-handed in its coiling.

Species 
Ariophanta laevipes is the type species of the genus Ariophanta.<ref name="Godwin-Austen">Blanford W. T. & Godwin-Austen H. H. 1908. The Fauna of British India, Including Ceylon and Burma. Mollusca. Testacellidae and Zonitidae. Taylor & Francis, London, 311 pp., page 25–30.</ref>

Species in the genus Ariophanta include:
 Ariophanta albata (W. T. Blanford, 1880)
 Ariophanta ammonia (Deshayes, 1850)
 Ariophanta basilessa (Benson, 1865)
 Ariophanta basileus (Benson, 1861)
 Ariophanta beddomei (W. T. Blanford, 1874)
 Ariophanta belangeri (Deshayes, 1832)
 Ariophanta bistrialis (H. Beck, 1837)
 Ariophanta bombayana (Grateloup, 1840)
 Ariophanta canarica W. T. Blanford, 1901
 Ariophanta crossei (L. Pfeiffer, 1862)
 Ariophanta cysis (Benson, 1852)
 Ariophanta danae (L. Pfeiffer, 1863)
 Ariophanta gassii W. T. Blanford, 1901
 Ariophanta himalana (I. Lea, 1834)
 Ariophanta immerita (W. T. Blanford, 1870)
 Ariophanta innata Fulton, 1905
 Ariophanta intumescens (W. T. Blanford, 1866)
 Ariophanta kadapaensis (Nevill, 1878)
 Ariophanta laevipes (O. F. Müller, 1774)
 Ariophanta laidlayana (Benson, 1856)
 Ariophanta maderaspatana (Gray, 1834)
 Ariophanta prionotropis (Möllendorff, 1898)
 Ariophanta promiscua (E. A. Smith, 1893)
 Ariophanta semirugata (Beck, 1837)
 Ariophanta sisparica (W. T. Blanford, 1866)
 Ariophanta solata (Benson, 1848)
 Ariophanta thyreus (Benson, 1852)
 Ariophanta tongkingensis (Möllendorff, 1902)
 Ariophanta trangensis Thach & F. Huber, 2020
Taxa inquirenda:
 Ariophanta duplocincta Möllendorff, 1897 
 Ariophanta huberi Thach, 2018 (debated synonym)
 Ariophanta trifasciata'' (Chemnitz)

Distribution 
This genus is endemic to India.

References 
The article incorporates public domain text from the reference.

 Bank, R. A. (2017). Classification of the Recent terrestrial Gastropoda of the World. Last update: July 16th, 2017

Further reading 
 Studies on the Reproductive Tract of Ariophanta maderaspatana (Gray) (Mollusca: Pulmonata)

External links 
  Jousseaume F. (1894). Mollusques recueillis à Ceylan par M. E. Simon, et révision générale des espèces terrestres et fluvio-lacustres de cette ile. Mémoires de la Société Zoologique de France. 7: 264-330
 Godwin-Austen, H. H. (1882-1920). Land and freshwater Mollusca of India, including South Arabia, Baluchistan, Afghanistan, Kashmir, Nepal, Burmah, Pegu, Tenasserim, Malay Peninsula, Ceylon, and other islands of the Indian Ocean. Supplementary to Messrs. Theobald and Hanley's Conchologia Indica. London, Taylor & Francis.

Ariophantidae